Lucas Damian Malacarne (born 25 November 1988) is an Argentine footballer who plays as a defender for FK Kukësi in the Albanian Superliga

Career 
Malacarne started his career with Argentine giants Comisión de Actividades Infantiles(CAI) from Comodoro Rivadavia, Chubut Province as a teenager. He had a trial at Major League Soccer side FC Dallas which led to a short-term loan move to the United States in 2008. He then played for Argentine team Club Atlético River Plate in 2009 before heading to Albania with FK Dinamo Tirana during the summer of 2009.

Dinamo Tirana
Malacarne arrived at Tirana International Airport Nënë Tereza on 4 July 2009 despite reports in Albania stating that his move to FK Dinamo Tirana would be completed no sooner than 3 August 2009. He made his competitive debut for the club in the Europa League 2009-10 2nd leg tie against FC Lahti. He performed well on his debut which helped the club to a 2–0 win over the Finnish side, however it was not enough as FK Dinamo Tirana crashed out of the competition after a 3–2 aggregate loss. Malacarne also scored an important goal for FK Dinamo Tirana in the 1st match of the 2nd qualifying leg of UEFA Champions League against Sheriff Tiraspol, after a corner kick shot by Elis Bakaj. This goal kept the 'blues'of Tirana in game for qualifying to the next UEFA Champions League leg, but the victory 1–0 against the moldavians wasn't enough. Malacarne has also scored a goal, again with a header against KF Skënderbeu Korçë in Qemal Stafa Stadium, as FK Dinamo Tirana won 3–0. Also the Argentinian defender scored an important goal against KF Laçi, as the home team of KF Laçi was putting the capital team under pressure. Malacarne has also scored a goal at the friendly match to Prohorje(Slovenia), Dinamo Tirana-Nacional Madeira, by scoring with header after a corner kick. Malacarne also has scored a goal during the season 2010–2011, at the match which took place in Tirana against KS Bylis Ballsh, by scoring with a header after a corner kick

The Argentine's league debut was put on hold after an injury to his arm which made him until 13 September 2009 to make his Albanian Superliga in a home match against KS Teuta Durrës. Malacarne proved that he was enjoying life in Albania and put in another good display which was complemented by his 30th-minute goal that sealed the win for his new club. The goal came from a corner taken by Elis Bakaj; Malacarne managed to get his head to it and put it past the KS Teuta Durrës keeper, Bledar Vashaku.

References

1988 births
Living people
Argentine footballers
Association football defenders
Club Atlético River Plate footballers
Argentine expatriate footballers
Expatriate soccer players in the United States
FC Dallas players
Argentine expatriate sportspeople in the United States
Comisión de Actividades Infantiles footballers
Expatriate footballers in Albania
FK Dinamo Tirana players
Argentine expatriate sportspeople in Albania
FK Kukësi players
Kategoria Superiore players